Marcus Perenara is a New Zealand rugby league player who played professionally for the Parramatta Eels.

He is the brother of Henry Perenara and the cousin of current All Blacks (rugby union) TJ Perenara and Sonny Bill Williams.

Playing career
Perenara, a Bay Roskill Vikings junior, played for the Marist-Richmond Brothers in the Bartercard Cup between 2002 and 2004. He was a Schoolboy Kiwi in 2000. He led the Brothers to the 2004 Bartercard Cup Grand Final before they lost 20-40 to Mount Albert.

He was signed by the Parramatta Eels in 2005 and played one National Rugby League game for the club in 2006, coming off the bench. In 2006 he scored 5 tries and 4 field goals for 23 points for the Eels in the NSWRL Premier League. His last match for the club was the 2006 NSWRL Premier League grand final, where he scored the winning field goal.

References

1985 births
Living people
New Zealand rugby league players
New Zealand Māori rugby league players
Parramatta Eels players
Bay Roskill Vikings players
Marist Richmond Brothers players
Rugby league halfbacks
Rugby league players from Auckland